The name Carlotta has been used for eleven tropical cyclones in the Eastern Pacific Ocean and one in the Australian region of the South Pacific.

In the Eastern Pacific:
 Hurricane Carlotta (1967), did not make landfall.
 Hurricane Carlotta (1971), no land was affected.
 Hurricane Carlotta (1975), did not come near land.
 Hurricane Carlotta (1978), Category 4 hurricane, did not affect land.
 Tropical Storm Carlotta (1982), did not make landfall.
 Hurricane Carlotta (1988), did not make landfall.
 Hurricane Carlotta (1994), churned in the open ocean.
 Hurricane Carlotta (2000), killed 18 after sinking a freighter.
 Hurricane Carlotta (2006), remained at sea
 Hurricane Carlotta (2012), made landfall near Puerto Escondido, Mexico.
 Tropical Storm Carlotta (2018), brushed the southwestern coast of Mexico without making landfall.

In the Australian region:
 Cyclone Carlotta (1972), remained well off the Queensland coast.

Pacific hurricane set index articles
Australian region cyclone set index articles